Micăsasa is a commune located in Sibiu County, Transylvania, Romania. It is composed of four villages: Chesler, Micăsasa, Țapu and Văleni. Micăsasa and Țapu villages have fortified churches.

At the 2011 census, 93.4% of inhabitants were Romanians, 4.4% Hungarians, 1.5% Roma and 0.6% Germans.

References

Communes in Sibiu County
Localities in Transylvania